The Philippines competed at the 1960 Summer Olympics in Rome, Italy. 40 competitors, 36 men and 4 women, took part in 27 events in 7 sports.

Athletics

Basketball

Preliminary Round (Group D)
 Lost to Poland (68-86)
 Defeated Spain (84-82)
 Lost to Uruguay (76-80)
Classification 9-16 (Group C)
 Defeated Puerto Rico (82-80)
 Defeated Bulgaria (2-0, forfeit)
 Lost to Hungary (70-81)
Classification 9-12
 Lost to France (75-122)
 Defeated Mexico (65-64) → 11th place

Team Roster
Emilio Achacoso
Kurt Bachmann
Carlos Badion (c)
Narciso Bernardo
Geronimo "Gerry" Cruz
Felix Flores (alternate)
Alfonso "Boy" Marquez
Edgardo Ocampo
Constancio Ortiz
Eduardo Pacheco
Cristobal Ramas
Edgardo Roque
Roberto Yburan
Head Coach - Arturo Rius

Boxing

Sailing

Shooting

Seven sport shooters, all male, represented the Philippines in 1960.

25 m pistol
 Horacio Miranda

50 m pistol
 José Agdamag

300 m rifle, three positions
 Adolfo Feliciano

50 m rifle, three positions
 Adolfo Feliciano
 Bernardo San Juan

50 m rifle, prone
 Hernando Castelo
 César Jayme

Trap
 Enrique Beech

Swimming

Weightlifting

Featherweight
 Alberto Nogar → 8th place

References

External links
Official Olympic Reports

Nations at the 1960 Summer Olympics
1960
Summer Olympics